Jestico + Whiles is an architectural firm and interior design practice based in London, UK. It has completed a number of high-profile cultural, diplomatic, hotel and retail projects in Europe.

The firm
Jestico + Whiles was founded by Tom Jestico and John Whiles in 1977. The practice is a trust, jointly owned by its staff. 
It is known particularly for its work on London boutique hotels such as The Hempel and One Aldwych. 
However, the firm has a diverse workload, and is also experienced in many other sectors including universities, schools and social housing.

The head office of Jestico + Whiles is at Sutton Yard, Goswell Road in Clerkenwell, London EC1V. It also has an office in Prague, Czech Republic. It has completed major projects across Europe, the Middle East and India. 
Its expertise includes urban regeneration, conservation of historic buildings and low-energy building techniques.

Notable projects
Major projects, by year of completion and ordered by type, are:

Cultural and diplomatic
 1993: The British Council, Madrid
 2002: Diana, Princess of Wales Memorial Playground, London
 British Embassy, Latvia
 The British Council, Prague
 Embassy of the People's Republic of China, London
 2009: Pitzhanger Manor, London

Education
 2008: Mountbatten Building, ECS, University of Southampton, UK 
 Central School of Speech and Drama, London
 Haberdashers' Knights Academy, London
 Davidson Building, Haberdashers' Hatcham College, London
 Stoke Newington School, London
 New Line Learning Kent, London
 National Graphene Institute, University of Manchester, Manchester

Hotels and restaurants
 The Hempel, London, UK
 1999: One Aldwych, London
 2001: Hakkasan, London
 2007: Malmaison, Oxford Castle, UK – RICS Project of the Year
 2009: Adriana Marina Hotel and Spa, Hvar, Croatia
 2009: Andel's Hotel Prague, Czech Republic
 2009: Andel's Hotel Berlin, Germany
 Andel's Hotel Kraków, Poland
 2009: Andel's Hotel Łódź, Poland 
 2011: W Hotel, Leicester Square, London
 2011: Aloft Hotel, ExCeL London

Residential
 2000: House of the Future, St Fagans National History Museum, Cardiff
 2005: Abbots Wharf, Bartlett Park, Tower Hamlets  
 2006: Tanner Street, Barking, London

Retail
 2007: Old Spitalfields Market, London 
 2007: Fortnum & Mason, London

Awards 
 2006: Housing Design Award for Abbotts Wharf 
 2009: RIBA Award for the Mountbatten Building, ECS, University of Southampton
 2010: Contract Magazine, New York, Interior Design Award for Andel's Hotel Lodz
 2011: highest-placed architects in the Sunday Times Green List
 2011: RIBA Award for Stoke Newington School and Sixth Form

See also 
List of architecture firms
List of British architecture firms

References

External links 

Jestico + Whiles Architects, England: Information, e-architect.co.uk

Architecture firms based in London
Interior design firms
Design companies established in 1977
Companies based in the London Borough of Camden
Employee-owned companies of the United Kingdom
1977 establishments in England